Duke Yi of Chen (reigned 780 BC – died 778 BC), given name Yue (說), was the ninth ruler of the ancient Chinese state of Chen during the Western Zhou dynasty. Yi was his posthumous name.

Duke Yi succeeded his father Duke Wu of Chen, who died in 781 BC. Duke Yi's reign coincided with that of King You, the last king of Western Zhou. Duke Yi died after only three years of reign, and was succeeded by his younger brother Xie, known as Duke Ping of Chen.

References

Bibliography

Monarchs of Chen (state)
8th-century BC Chinese monarchs
778 BC deaths